Reinhold Yabo (born 10 February 1992) is a German former professional footballer who played as a midfielder.

Career
Yabo began his career with Teutonia Niedermerz and joined 2001 into the youth of 1. FC Köln. He was to begin of the 2009–10 season promoted in the A-Jugend Bundesliga West, but he earned his first game on senior side for 1. FC Köln II on 8 August 2009 against Fortuna Düsseldorf II in the Regionalliga West.

After four games more for the reserve team of 1. FC Köln he earned his first Bundesliga game against VfL Bochum on 16 April 2010.

Yabo announced his retirement from playing aged 29 in May 2021, at the conclusion of the 2020–21 season, due to knee problems.

International career
Yabo was the captain of the Germany under-17 national team at the 2009 UEFA European Under-17 Football Championship in Germany and won the European Championship with the team. Later tat year he played at the 2009 World Cup earning four caps in the tournament in Nigeria.

Personal life
Yabo was born in Aldenhoven to Congolese parents. On 25 May 2014, he was elected as a member of the city council of Karlsruhe.

Career statistics

Honours
 2009: UEFA European Under-17 Football Championship
 2009: Fritz-Walter-Medaille
 2009: Honorary Citizen of Aldenhoven

References

External links

 
 Reinhold Yabo at DFB.de
 

1992 births
Living people
People from Düren (district)
Sportspeople from Cologne (region)
German sportspeople of Democratic Republic of the Congo descent
German footballers
Association football midfielders
Germany youth international footballers
Bundesliga players
2. Bundesliga players
Austrian Football Bundesliga players
1. FC Köln players
1. FC Köln II players
Karlsruher SC players
Alemannia Aachen players
FC Red Bull Salzburg players
Arminia Bielefeld players
German expatriate footballers
Expatriate footballers in Austria
German expatriate sportspeople in Austria
Footballers from North Rhine-Westphalia